Young-ja Lee (born 4 June 1931) is a South Korean music educator and composer. She is considered by many the greatest living female Korean composer.

Life and career
Born in Wonju, she studied at Ewha Womans University, the Conservatoire de Paris, and the Royal Conservatory of Brussels. She continued her education at the Manhattan School of Music. Lee endured hardships during the Japanese occupation and Korean War, but emerged to become one of the dominant forces in Korean music in the 20th century.

She was one of the six founding members of the Korean Society of Women Composers and served as the first president for the organization. She is often called the "Face and Mother of Korean Modern Music." Her works have been performed internationally and are available as recordings.

Young-Ja Lee's music combines elements from French, West African, Indonesian gamelan, and traditional Korean music, creating unusual intercultural compositions. She is also noted for her particular mixtures of Western and Korean music.

Works
Selected works include:
Pelerinage de l’Ame for Violin, Cello, and Piano
Trio for flute, clarinet and bassoon
Variations for piano
Lament for three kotos
Six songs
Réminiscences de la Proven

References

1931 births
Living people
20th-century classical composers
Conservatoire de Paris alumni
South Korean music educators
South Korean classical composers
South Korean expatriates in Belgium
South Korean expatriates in France
Royal Conservatory of Brussels alumni
Women classical composers
South Korean women
Women music educators
20th-century women composers